The Highway 7 Rapidway in York Region, Ontario, Canada, is a bus rapid transit right-of-way that runs from Bruce Street in Vaughan to Birchmount Road in Markham. There are plans to extend it west to Highway 50 and east to Cornell Terminal. It is served by Viva Purple, Viva Pink, Viva Orange and Viva Green bus routes.

Route description 
The Highway 7 Rapidway consists of bus lanes in the median of Highway 7 between Pine Valley Drive in Vaughan and Town Centre Boulevard in Markham. It also includes a bus-only road parallel to Enterprise Drive, between Warden Avenue and Birchmount Road. Stations along the rapidway are longer than typical bus stations, and include heated shelters protected from the elements.

On March 6, 2011, the first segment of the rapidway from Warden Road to Birchmount Road including the Warden rapidway station opened. On August 18, 2013, the Rapidway along Highway 7 opened from Richmond Hill Centre to East Beaver Creek Drive and the subsequent year to Town Centre Boulevard (and to Cedarland on December 28, 2014).

On February 26, 2017, YRT 77 Highway 7 buses began serving the Creditstone and Keele stations along Highway 7 West Rapidway. After the extension of the Line 1 Yonge–University subway opened, Viva Orange began serving these stations along with the opening of the Vaughan Metropolitan Centre Rapidway station. Later phases will extend the rapidway west to Highway 50 and east to Cornell Terminal, potentially to the Durham Region border at the York–Durham Line.

Stations

There are 25 operating rapidway stations. All stations are built at-grade.

Züm route 501 uses the busway between the Wigwoss–Helen and Vaughan Metropolitan Centre stations.

Queen Street–Highway 7 BRT

In January 2023, Metrolinx proposed extending the rapidway  westwards along Highway 7 from Helen Street in Vaughan and continuing along Queen Street in Brampton to terminate at Mississauga Road. This would allow buses to travel in reserved lanes from the west end of Brampton to Vaughan Metropolitan Centre. Metrolinx has dubbed the project the Queen Street–Highway 7 BRT or Q7BRT.

References

External links

Viva Rapid Transit
Transport in the Regional Municipality of York
The Big Move projects
Busways
Bus rapid transit in Canada